Zaki  (Arabic زكي ) is an Arabic male name (with female form Zakiya) and surname. Notable people with the name include:Zaki is a boy name of Arabic and Hebrew origin meaning “pure.”

Given name 
Zaki al-Arsuzi (1899–1998), Syrian politician
Zaki Tun Azmi (born 1945), Malaysian judge
Zaki Badawi (1922–2006), Egyptian Islamic scholar
Zaki Badr (1926-1997), Egyptian security officer and politician
Zaki Chehab (born 1956), Lebanese-British journalist
Zaki al-Khatib (1887–1961), Syrian politician
Zaki Naguib Mahmoud (1905–1993), Egyptian philosopher
Zaki Mazboudi (1920–2000), Lebanese politician
Zaki Nassif (1918–2004), Lebanese composer
Zaki Nusseibeh (died 2004), UAE diplomat
Zaki Rostom (1903–1978), Egyptian actor

Middle name 
Muhammad Zaki Butt (1929–1993), Pakistani air force pilot

Surname 
Aamir Zaki, Pakistani guitar player
Abbas Zaki, Palestinian politician
Ahmad Zaki (disambiguation), several persons
Akram Zaki, Pakistani politician
Amadou Aboubakar Zaki (born 1988), Nigerien basketball player
Amr Zaki (born 1983), Egyptian footballer
Badr Zaki (born 1988), Moroccan footballer
Ibrahim Hussein Zaki (born 1947), Maldives politician
Kawthar Zaki (born 1940), Egyptian-American microwave engineer
Kim Khan Zaki (born 1982), Singaporean kickboxer
Mohamed Zaki (born 1953), Maldives businessman
Mona Zaki (born 1976), Egyptian actress
Muad Mohamed Zaki (born 1982), Maldives politician
Muhamed Amin Zaki (1880–1948), Kurdish historian and politician
Soheir Zaki, Egyptian belly dancer and actress
Wissam Zaki (born 1986), Iraqi footballer
Zakia Zaki (died 2007), Afghan journalist
Zeeko Zaki (born 1990), American actor of Egyptian descent

References

Arabic-language surnames
Arabic masculine given names